The Ford Essex V6 engine is a 60° V6 engine built between 1966 and 1988 by the Ford Motor Company in the United Kingdom and until 2000 in South Africa although mostly in the Ford engine plant of Dagenham, Essex, which gave the engine its name. It is closely related to the Ford Essex V4 engine produced in displacements of 1.7 L and 2.0 L. Both engines share many parts since the Essex V6 was directly derived from the Essex V4; the 2.0 L Essex V4 and the 3.0 L Essex V6 in fact have exactly the same bore and stroke and share various components.

History
The Essex V4 and V6 were mainly designed to replace the outdated and ageing inline-four and six-cylinder Ford Zephyr engines. These engines were fitted to a wide range of vehicles, from Ford Transit vans to sedans, coupés like the Ford Capri and sports cars like TVRs and Marcos.

At the same time, the oil dipstick was moved from the front of the engine to the side, the inlet manifold was improved from earlier models, and the compression ratio was raised slightly from 8.9:1 to 9.0:1 due to a change of the piston design.

The shape of the inlet ports was also changed from an O-port design to a D-port design which improved the flow characteristics of the heads, the old 40 DFAV Weber carburetor that was prone to over-fueling and resulting bore wash was replaced by the 38 DGAS Weber carburetor, the air filter housing was also changed and later around 1976 a hot air intake was added consisting of a metal pipe running from the top of a plate welded on the exhaust manifold or header to an opening in the air intake to prevent the carburetor from icing and making the engine warm up  more quickly. The carburetor was also modified again, a return-style fuel system was adopted and a vacuum-operated choke in the air filter housing were also added. This, and a positive crankcase ventilation (PCV) system were also early forms of emissions control.

The camshaft gear was also made slightly stronger by using steel with nylon teeth instead of being completely made from nylon as on previous ones. Aftermarket steel, aluminium, and alloy gears have been produced as replacements to prevent the gear from stripping its teeth: this is commonly due to overheating causing the nylon to weaken. This is one of the two major weak points of the Essex V-engines, the other being the hexagonal oil pump spindle / shaft which can round off, or even break.

The 2.5 L engine was rated at  SAE gross or  DIN and peak torque was rated at  SAE gross or  DIN. The 2.5-litre version ended production in 1977 along with the Essex V4 engine. It featured blue rocker covers in order to distinguish the engine from the usual 3.0 L engine and it also featured hand-polished and ported inlet and exhaust ports. These figures vary somewhat depending on the source. The Essex V6 also formed the base for the 3.4 L Cosworth GAA born in May 1972 and designed by Mike Hall, also responsible for designing Cosworth's famous DFV Engine. Mike Hall's intention was to design the cylinder heads so that 3 spark plugs per cylinder could be fitted, but this idea was dropped since there was no appreciable increase in power or torque. This engine was used in the racing version of the Capri RS 3100, competing successfully in the European Touring Car Championship, as well as in Formula 5000 single-seaters. One hundred kits were also sold by Ford Motorsport.
 

Earlier versions of the 3.0-litre engine (pre-October 1971) were fueled by a twin-choke 40 DFAV Weber carburetor, which had some inherent faults in its design which caused it to run too rich and cause bore wash. It was subsequently replaced by a more modern twin-choke 38 DGAS Weber carburetor which effectively solved the problems of the earlier carburetors, and was used for the 3-litre V6 until the end of its production. The 2.5-litre V6 used a single barrel Ford carburetor which was also used in the low-compression variants of the 3.0-litre Essex V6 used in the Ford Transit. Unusually, the Essex V6 was designed so that the same block could serve in both diesel (compression ignition) and petrol applications, although the diesel version never reached production. Traces of its diesel design lie in the very heavy construction using Heron cylinder heads and the necessity for dished pistons to decrease compression for the petrol engine. In spite of its heaviness, the Essex V6 was used as the main workhorse and a high performance option for medium to full-sized cars like the Capri the Granada and Transit. Ford supplied Essex V6-powered Transit vans to the police and ambulance services in the UK from the late 1960s until 1989, when it was replaced by more modern engines such as the fuel injected 2.8 and 2.9 L Ford Cologne V6 engine although the Essex V6 was even used until April 2000 in South Africa.
 
TVR contracted the company Broadspeed to develop a turbocharging system for their TVR 3000S turbo. In lieu of fuel injection, the carburettor was run inside a pressurized box atop the engine, and the turbocharger itself was mounted low and forward in the engine compartment, requiring the exhaust manifolds to exit forward. The compression ratio was lowered from 9.0:1 to 8.0:1 to reduce the engine's internal stresses.

Broadspeed also designed a turbocharging system For the Mk1 Ford Capri 3.0, available since early 1970 these Capris were known as "Broadspeed Bullet Capris". The engine was heavily modified and included modified cylinder heads, a high-lift camshaft, a re-jetted carburetor, a completely blueprinted rotating assembly, lowered 8.2:1 compression ratio, a modified inlet manifold and exhaust system using a single turbocharger. Similar to the TVR 3000S' turbocharging system, it used a "blow-through carburettor" system in which the standard but re-jetted 38 DGAS Weber carburetor was run inside a pressurised airbox. Performance figures further increased with the uprated post-October 1971 versions of the engine.

.

US emissions certification

In 1977, Californian company Olson Engineering, Inc. was contracted by TVR to design modifications to the Essex V6 such that it could be emissions-certified for use in the United States. This allowed TVR to sell its Essex-engined M Series cars in that market for the 1978 and 1979 model years. An owner's handbook supplement for US Federal models indicates that the emissions control system used a catalytic converter, exhaust gas recirculation, and secondary air injection. A shipment of approximately twenty 3000Ss arrived in September 1979, and were marked by the import company as being emissions compliant without the Olson Engineering emissions kit actually having been fitted. Dealers were made aware of this fact, but were each apparently coerced into buying at least two of the non-compliant cars with the threat of withholding spare parts for other TVR models. One dealer explained the situation to a customer who happened to work for the US government in an emissions-regulation capacity, and he reported the violation to the authorities. The cars were then impounded. During the long period of time during which Martin Lilley attempted to communicate with US customs officials to resolve the situation, the cars were neglected and stored outside, where they deteriorated and were vandalized. The cars were eventually re-exported, repaired, and sold in Germany, but the short-term financial impact of the unsalable cars (worth over £100,000 in total) was damaging to the development of the M Series replacement, the Tasmin.

South Africa

In South Africa, the engine continued in production from 1982 up to April 2000 for use in the Sapphire Saloon and Sierra vehicles, and Courier pick-ups. Late in its production life it was fitted with Lucas controlled electronic fuel injection designed by SAMCOR (South African Motor Corporation – now Ford SA) in co-operation with the University of Pretoria's engineering department. Only about 1,600 of the EFI variants were produced during 1992 and 1993. All 3.4 variants used the 38DGAS Weber carburetor with  venturis. Production tooling at the factory was scrapped and sold in 2000, to make way for the production of a new four cylinder OHC engine, the remaining old stock of 3.4 L Engines started to be sold as assembled crate engines, these engines had some differences from the 2.5 3.0 and 3.1 L Dagenham built engines such as: Ford Cologne 2.8 / 2.9 V6 forged connecting rods, German made pistons with moly coating,  smaller crank journals which reduced bearing speed, more aggressive camshaft timing and higher lift, larger  inlet valves, shaft mounted rockers from Ford's Cologne 2.8 / 2.9 V6 engine, unique cylinder head castings with extra oil galleries, solid pushrods with no oiling holes, unique exhaust manifold bolt pattern due to the head castings also being unique to the 3.4-litre engine and an improved inlet manifold with larger runners and an improved plenum chamber. From 1966 to 1998, the 3.0L was also used in industrial applications such as generator plants, airport vehicles, milk vans, jet boats (Hamilton jet) and even river barges.

Vehicles using the Essex V6 

The Essex V6 was fitted to a wide variety of cars, both from Ford and from smaller specialist manufacturers that used Ford engines. Among these were the following:

United Kingdom
 AC ME3000 3.0 L
 Ford Capri 3.0 L and 3.1 L
 Ford Granada 2.5 L and 3.0 L
 Ford Consul (Granada Mk1 Based) 2.5 L and 3.0 L  
 Ford Transit 3.0 L (only police and ambulance services)
 Ford A series
 Ford Zephyr 2.5 L and 3.0 L
 Ford Zodiac 2.5 L and 3.0 L
 Gilbern Genie 2.5 L and 3.0 L
 Gilbern Invader 3.0 L
 Marcos (various models) 3.0 L
 Reliant Scimitar 2.5 L and 3.0 L
 TVR 3000M – 3.0 L
 TVR 3000S – 3.0 L
 TVR Taimar 3.0 L
 TVR Tuscan V6 3.0 L

Custom installations
 Ford Escort Apache 3.0 L 
 Ford Corsair Crayford 3.0 L
 Ford Cortina Savage 3.0 L 
 Ford Cortina Cheetah 2.5 L
 Ford Escort Superspeed Mk1 3.0 L
 Ford Capri Broadspeed 3.0 L 
 Ford Capri Broadspeed 3.0 L turbo 
 Ford Capri Comanche 3.0 L 
 Ford Transit Easipower 3.0 L 
 Ford Granada Seneca 3.0 L
 Ford Capri 3.0 L Perana V6

South Africa
 Ford Zephyr and Zodiac (Mk4)
 Ford Cortina Perana (Mk2)
 Ford Capri 3.0 L Perana V6 

 Ford 17M and 20M (Taunus)
 Ford Transit van V4 + V6 
 Ford Capri (Mk1)1970 to 1973.
 Ford Cortina (Mk3, Mk4, Mk5)
 Ford Granada (Mk1, Mk2)
 Ford Sierra hatch 1984 to 1993.
 Ford Sierra/Sapphire 1989 to 1993.
 Ford Sapphire Ghia (EFI engined Sapphire) 1992 to 1993
 Ford Sierra/sapphire 3.0i RS (EFI engined Sierra produced alongside the Sapphire Ghia)
 Ford 1 ton pickup (Cortina Mk3+ Mk4 + Mk5 based) 1974 to 1985.
 Ford Courier/Mazda Drifter 1 ton pickup 1986 to 2000
 Also fitted by a number of companies as aftermarket conversions in VW Kombi and Toyota Hiace
 Ferrino Sports car, based on Ferrari Dino, using a tubular chassis and glassfibre body.
 Lynx Roadster, based on Ford Cortina chassis with glassfibre body.

Netherlands
 Spijkstaal (mobile supermarket)

See also
 List of Ford engines

References

 Musselwhite, B.  Tuning the Essex V6. Classic Ford Magazine, reproduced at  The MkIV Zephyr & Zodiac.
About the Essex engine.The V4 essex

Essex V6
V6 engines
Gasoline engines by model